Brian Hitchen, CBE (8 July 1936 – 2 December 2013) was a British newspaper editor. Late in his career, he worked as a publisher.

Hitchen began his career with the Daily Despatch in Manchester as a copyboy, and then joined the Bury Times as a trainee reporter a year later. His national service followed in which he served in the Parachute Regiment during 1954–56. After national service, following a year on the Manchester Evening News, he began his national newspaper career when he joined the Daily Mirror in their Manchester office. In 1963 he became their foreign correspondent in Paris, and then from 1965 to 1972, he reported from all over the world for the Mirror.

In 1965 he was sent to cover the 1965 India-Pakistan War. Whilst working for the Daily Mirrors New York City bureau he reported on the 1968 Assassination of Martin Luther King Jr. and on the May 1970 Bogota Bracelet scandal involving  England's captain, Bobby Moore, before the 1970 World Cup. Hitchen returned to London on the news desk for the Daily Mirror in 1972, later joining the Daily Express in the same post where he remained between 1973 and 1978.

Hitchen edited the Daily Star from 1987 to 1994, when he became the editor of the Sunday Express for a year. In 1996, he set up Brian Hitchen Communications and also became chairman of the Kerry Life and Irish Country Life publications.

In 2013, an incident with a car while crossing the road near Alicante, Spain, led to Hitchen's wife being killed instantly, while Hitchen himself died from his injuries a few hours later.

Hitchen was appointed a CBE in Margaret Thatcher's resignation honours list in 1990.

References

1936 births
2013 deaths
20th-century English businesspeople
Daily Star (United Kingdom) people
English newspaper editors
English male journalists
English publishers (people)
British expatriates in Spain
Road incident deaths in Spain
British Parachute Regiment soldiers
Commanders of the Order of the British Empire
Pedestrian road incident deaths
People from Chadderton